Shepetivka is a railway hub of the Kozyatyn directory of Southwestern Railways.

Gallery

References

External links
 Shepetivka station at railwayz.info (photos) 

Shepetivka
Railway stations in Khmelnytskyi Oblast
Southwestern Railways stations
Buildings and structures in Khmelnytskyi Oblast